Evgeniy Averchenko (born 6 April 1982) is a Kazakh football midfielder who plays for FC Taraz.

Averchenko began his career playing for FC Esil Bogatyr in 2001. He moved to FC Aktobe in 2009.

Averchenko has made two appearances for the Kazakhstan national football team.

References

External links

1982 births
Living people
Kazakhstani footballers
Kazakhstan international footballers
Kazakhstan Premier League players
FC Kyzylzhar players
FC Aktobe players
FC Tobol players
FC Irtysh Pavlodar players
FC Taraz players
Expatriate footballers in Kazakhstan
Association football midfielders
People from Petropavl
Kazakhstani people of Ukrainian descent